Ndia Constituency is an electoral constituency in Kenya. It is one of four constituencies in Kirinyaga County, Central Province. The constituency was established for the 1988 elections.

Members of Parliament

Locations and wards

References 

Constituencies in Kirinyaga County
Constituencies in Central Province (Kenya)
1988 establishments in Kenya
Constituencies established in 1988